Union Carriage & Wagon (UCW) is a rolling stock manufacturer in South Africa.

History

Union Carriage & Wagon was established in 1957. Initial shareholders were Commonwealth Engineering (51%), Budd Company (25%) and Leyland Motors (12%). By 1965, Budd and Metro Cammell Weymann held a combined 41% shareholding which they sold to Anglo American plc and General Mining. In December 1969, Commonwealth Engineering reduced its shareholding to 42% with the other two shareholders each owning 29%.

Having initially built carriages, in 1964, UCW delivered its first electrical locomotives to the South African Railways, the South African Class 5E1, Series 2. The Class 5E1 was also the first electrical locomotive to be produced in quantity in South Africa. 

In 1974, UCW entered the international market with orders from Angola and Zambia. In 1976, UCW received its first Asian order for twenty Type E100 electric locomotives for Taiwan Railways Administration (TRA), based on a GEC design. In addition, the TRA E1000 push-pull trainsets were also manufactured jointly by UCW, GEC-Alsthom, Tang Eng Iron Works of Taiwan and Hyundai Rotem of South Korea.

Rolling stock for Gautrain is assembled at the UCW plant in Nigel under a partnership agreement between Bombardier Transportation and UCW.

In 1987, Commonwealth Engineering Parent company Australian National Industries sold its shareholding to Malbak Limited. In October 1996, the business was sold to Murray & Roberts. In February 2013, UCW was purchased by Commuter Transport Engineering.

See also
:Category:Union Carriage & Wagon locomotives

References

External links

Last archived version of official website (May 2014)
Commuter Transport Engineering official website

Companies based in Ekurhuleni
Locomotive manufacturers of South Africa
South African brands
Vehicle manufacturing companies established in 1957
1957 establishments in South Africa